Grey Group is a global advertising and marketing agency with headquarters in New York City, and 432 offices in 96 countries, operating in 154 cities. It is organized into four geographical units: North America; Europe, Middle East & Africa, Asia-Pacific and Latin America.

As a unit of communications conglomerate WPP Group, Grey Global Group operates branded independent business units in many communications disciplines, including advertising, direct marketing, public relations, public affairs, brand development, customer relationship management, sales promotion, and interactive marketing, through its subsidiaries: Grey, G2, GHG, GCI Group, MediaCom Worldwide, Alliance, G WHIZ, and WING.

Grey Group's international clients include Procter & Gamble, GlaxoSmithKline, Nokia, British American Tobacco, Diageo, Volkswagen, Novartis, Wyeth, Canon, DirecTV, and 3M.

The company has won 10 Cannes Lions, an Addy, a Clio and an Emmy Award. Grey Group's European network, Grey EMEA, won 26 Euro Effie awards, and is the five-time Euro Effie Agency Network of the Year, in the four consecutive years of 2005–2008 and again in 2012.

History

In , Grey acquired its first major client, Procter & Gamble. In 1961, billings reached $59 million and in the same year, Herbert D. Strauss was named president and the firm expanded domestically and internationally. In 1961, the firm opened an office in Los Angeles, and in 1962 the firm opened an office in London and in 1963 in Japan. In 1964, billings reached $100 million.

In 1965, the firm went public, trading on the Nasdaq exchange, and the firm expanded into the use of psychographics (the analysis of consumer lifestyles). In 1966, Grey became one of the top 10 agencies in the U.S.

In 1967, Strauss was named chief executive officer and chairman, and Edward H. Meyer was named president. In 1969, Strauss was named chairman In 1970, Meyer was named chief executive officer.

In the 1970s, Grey was responsible for several popular ad campaigns including Star Wars toys for Kenner, aspirin and toothpaste for SmithKline, and Stove Top Stuffing for Kraft General Foods.

In 1973, Strauss died of a heart attack.

Through the 1960s and 1970s, Grey continued to acquire major accounts, and grew into related communication fields. In , Meyer became chief executive officer and would remain in that position for 36 years.

In , Grey Advertising became Grey Global Group. On , WPP Group beat out Havas in a race to acquire Grey Global, the seventh-largest advertising agency at the time, for approximately US$1.3 billion.

In late , James R. Heekin III became chief executive officer of Grey Worldwide, Grey Global Group's traditional advertising agency. On , he became chairman and chief executive officer of Grey Group, the renamed agency holding company. He reports to Martin Sorrell, chief executive officer of WPP Group.

Grey Group, Grey Advertising New York and G2 moved to a LEED certified building at 200 5th Avenue in New York in November 2009, after 45 years at their previous location.

Grey San Francisco is the company's San Francisco-based West Coast headquarters. Its clients include Symantec, LendingTree, Pernod Ricard, and SunEdison.

In 2016, Grey acquired ArcTouch, a mobile design and development studio, which it operates as a subsidiary.

In March 2017, Grey's London office announced its rebranding as Valenstein & Fatt for 100 days, to celebrate its Jewish founders and later executives, and to highlight prejudice in society.

In August 2017, Grey Group appointed Michael Houston as worldwide chief executive officer on its 100th anniversary.

In November 2020, WPP Group merged Grey Group and AKQA together to create AKQA Group.

In July 2022, Grey Group named Laura Maness the agency's global CEO, who previously worked at Havas. She is the sixth CEO in Grey history and the first woman to attain the role.

Notable work

Leave the Driving to Us (Greyhound) 
In 1956, Grey co-founder Arthur C. Fatt wrote the longstanding Greyhound Lines catchphrase "Leave the driving to us."

Let the Issues Be the Issue 
During the final weeks of the 2008 United States presidential election, the firm debuted a self-funded political ad depicting candidates Barack Obama and John McCain with inverted skin tones and the text "LET THE ISSUES BE THE ISSUE." The campaign was rolled-out both digitally and via newspaper ads and posters hung around New York City. According to creative director Tor Myhren, it was "a non-partisan image. We wanted to address the race issue straight on. And it cuts both ways; if you're hopping on either candidate's bandwagon solely due to the color of their skin, you're voting for the wrong reasons."

Time Sculpture 
In November 2008, the firm began working with Toshiba to advertise its high-definition television upscaling technology. Its first ad, Time Sculpture, was a British television and cinema advertisement which comprised a collection of interacting movement loops sequenced into a single shot. The commercial was based on a video art proposal by director Mitch Stratten. Time Sculpture holds the world record for the greatest number of moving image cameras used in a single shot.

Space Chair 
In 2009, the firm's London office developed a world record-setting campaign for Toshiba titled Space Chair. The minute-long ad featured the launch of an armchair into near space attached to a weather balloon at an altitude of —making it the highest-altitude television commercial that had ever been filmed.

Awards
In 2010, Grey was listed on Fast Companys "50 Most Innovative Companies". In 2010, it was added to Advertising Ages "Agency A-List". In 2006, Grey was awarded 12 "Spots of the Week" by Ad Age, which placed it second highest overall.

Controversy 
In 2016, Grey for Good, Grey Group's philanthropic communications division, created a hoax app that claimed to use crowdsourcing to help the refugee crisis in the Mediterranean Sea. After it was debunked by developers, the Apple Store pulled the app on the same day it was awarded a Bronze Lion at the Cannes Lions festival.

Awards and nominations

In popular culture
 In the AMC series Mad Men, Duck Phillips joins Grey Advertising after being dumped by Sterling Cooper. The agency is frequently referenced as a chief competitor of Sterling Cooper throughout the series.
 In episode three of the 2010 series of BBC Three's Young, Dumb and Living Off Mum, the young adults spend a day at Grey Advertising working on a mock sexual health campaign.

References

External links
 Official website
 Grey Cannes 2013
 Grey creative work and company info
 Grey EMEA
 Grey LATAM

WPP plc
Advertising agencies of the United States
Companies based in New York City
1917 establishments in New York City